St Joseph's Cathedralis the cathedral for the Roman Catholic Diocese of Dunedin. It is located in City Rise in the city of Dunedin, New Zealand. It serves as the seat of the bishop of the Latin Church Roman Catholic Diocese of Dunedin, which was erected on 26 November 1869.

History 

The Gothic revival cathedral was designed by Francis Petre, who also later, in a complete change of style to Palladian revival, designed St Patrick's Basilica, Oamaru (1894), Sacred Heart Cathedral, Wellington (1901), the Cathedral of the Blessed Sacrament, Christchurch (1905), St. Mary's Basilica, Invercargill (1905), St Patrick's Basilica, Waimate (1909) and Sacred Heart Basilica, Timaru (1911). 

Construction of the Cathedral started in 1878, during the episcopacy of Bishop Patrick Moran. It was used for its first church service in February 1886, and was completed in its unfinished state in May 1886, at a cost of £22,500. The original design, however, was for a much larger building, with a tall spire with a height of 100 meters over the transept.

A description of St Joseph's Cathedral from a letter of the reporter of the Auckland Evening Star in 1889 says, "The cable tram has carried you up barely two hundred feet when you see a double-towered church of dark grey stone standing on a site cut into the hill. This is the Catholic Cathedral, St Joseph — and it is a gem. The outside gives you no idea of the beauty within." This is a poor description of what was built. While it falls short of the original conception the building as it stands gives a better idea of the outstanding structure which was never completed.

Renovations 
The cathedral has undergone several modifications, the most notable being the removal of the High Altar after Vatican II; it was returned after a long sojourn in the Dunedin Public Art Gallery. The side altar was dismantled in early 1970, and has since been made into a large Tabernacle, kept in the Blessed Sacrament chapel beside the sanctuary. 

A new Reconciliation Room has been added to replace the old confessionals in the nave of the cathedral. In February 2023, the confessionals were renovated and returned to their original use.

Priory and Cathedral Chapel 
St Joseph's Cathedral is located beside St Dominic's Priory, also designed by Petre, in 1876. The Priory is no longer used. 

The Cathedral Chapel is situated behind the Priory, and the Traditional Latin Mass is still celebrated there every Sunday. The Cathedral choir also uses this as their practice space.

Behind the cathedral is the Catholic Pastoral Centre, containing the Bishop's office and also the Catholic library.

Education 
The cathedral also has a primary school in its parish. Not surprisingly named St Joseph's Cathedral School. The school is one of many Catholic Primary schools that feed into Trinity Catholic College, located next to Cathedral.

References

Further reading 

Knight, H., and Wales, N. (1988). Buildings of Dunedin. Dunedin: John McIndoe.

External links 

St Joseph's Cathedral

Roman Catholic churches completed in 1878
19th-century Roman Catholic church buildings in New Zealand
1886 establishments in New Zealand

Basilica churches in New Zealand
Francis Petre church buildings
Gothic Revival church buildings in New Zealand
Heritage New Zealand Category 1 historic places in Otago
Roman Catholic cathedrals in New Zealand
Listed churches in New Zealand
1870s architecture in New Zealand
Churches in Dunedin
Central Dunedin
Stone churches in New Zealand